The Latin Emperor was the ruler of the Latin Empire, the historiographical convention for the Crusader realm, established in Constantinople after the Fourth Crusade (1204) and lasting until the city was recovered by the Byzantine Greeks in 1261. Its name derives from its Catholic and Western European ("Latin") nature. The empire, whose official name was Imperium Romaniae (Latin: "Empire of Romania"), claimed the direct heritage of the Eastern Roman Empire, which had most of its lands taken and partitioned by the crusaders. This claim however was disputed by the Byzantine Greek successor states, the Empire of Nicaea, the Empire of Trebizond and the Despotate of Epirus. Out of these three, the Nicaeans succeeded in displacing the Latin emperors in 1261 and restored the Byzantine Empire.

Latin emperors of Constantinople, 1204–1261

Latin emperors of Constantinople in exile, 1261–1383 

Baldwin II (1261–1273), in exile from Constantinople
Philip I (1273–1283), his son
Empress regnant Catherine I (1283–1307), his daughter, with...
Charles (1301–1307), her husband
Empress regnant Catherine II (1307–1346), their daughter, with...
Philip II (1313–1331), her husband
Robert II (1346–1364), their son
Philip III (1364–1373), his brother
James (1373–1383), his nephew

James of Baux willed his titular claims to Duke Louis I of Anjou, also claimant to the throne of Naples, but Louis and his descendants never used the title.

See also
List of Latin empresses
List of Roman emperors 
List of Byzantine emperors

References

 
Latin Empire